The Analog Protection System (APS), also known as Copyguard or Macrovision,  is a VHS and DVD copy protection system originally developed by Macrovision. Video tapes copied from DVDs encoded with APS become garbled and unwatchable. The process works by adding pulses to analog video signals to negatively impact the AGC circuit of a recording device. In digital devices, changes to the analog video signal are created by a chip that converts the digital video to analog within the device. In DVD players, trigger bits are created during DVD authoring to inform the APS that it should be applied to DVD players' analog outputs or analog video outputs on a PC while playing back a protected DVD-Video disc. In set top boxes trigger bits are incorporated into Conditional Access Entitlement Control Messages (ECM) in the stream delivered to the STB. In VHS, alterations to the analog video signal are added in a Macrovision-provided “processor box” used by duplicators. Devices marketed as "Video Stabilizers", along with time base correctors, may be used to attempt removal of the Macrovision copy protection mechanism.

Digital recording devices (DVD recorders) often disallow the recording if they detect a protection signal on the input. The unit may display an error message about the program being copy protected.

APS can be also signaled digitally, in the CGMS-A bit field sent in the vertical blanking interval.

References

Smart Computing Dictionary Entry, Analog Protection System (2005). Welcome | Sandhills Global | Gather, Process, Distribute
Macrovision, Analog Protection System: A Presentation to the Analog Reconversion Discussion Group (2003). Wayback Machine

Digital rights management systems
Compact Disc and DVD copy protection